Emergency Records was an American independent record label from 1979 to 1989.

Founded in the United States in early 1979, Emergency Records specialized in products of the Italian disco sound of the 1970s and 1980s. During that time, the majority of the European production of disco music came from Germany, France, and Italy. Releases introduced electric instruments such as computers and synthesizers.

During 1981 and 1982 the label released productions that mixed late disco emotions with heavy funky rhythms that made the Emergency Sound.

As with many independent labels, in 1983 the label was looking for some hits of the dance music genre, and released early electro tracks such as "In the Bottle", "On the Upside" and "Let the Music Play". The international success of "Let The Music Play" allowed Emergency to continue until 1988.  In 1987 Emergency Records signed a deal with Profile Records for distribution, which was canceled after two years. In 1989 the company closed down. Its back catalogs were sold to Unidisc Music, with its vinyl recordings considered of interest to serious collectors.

Artists
12" singles.
 La Bionda
 Pino Presti
 Billy Moore
 Kano
 Vivien Vee
 Firefly
 North End featuring Michelle Wallace
 Lisa Fischer
 Shannon
 C.O.D.
 Nolan Thomas
 Amii Stewart featuring Mike Francis
 Sandy Marton

References

See also
List of record labels

American record labels
Record labels established in 1979
Record labels disestablished in 1989
Post-disco record labels